Larrainzar is a village in Navarra, Spain. It is the capital of the municipality of Ultzama and had 129 inhabitants in 2011.

José Ángel Ziganda, former footballer for Osasuna and Athletic Bilbao, was born in Larrainzar.

Populated places in Navarre